Covide is a Portuguese freguesia ("civil parish"), located in the municipality of Terras de Bouro in the district of Braga. The population in 2011 was 343, in an area of 19.87 km2. The village is located on the outskirts of the Peneda-Gerês National Park.

References 

Parishes of Terras de Bouro